The 2017 season was Hammarby Fotboll's 102st in existence, their 48th season in Allsvenskan and their 3rd consecutive season in the league. They competed in Allsvenskan and Svenska Cupen during the year. League play started in early April and lasted until early November. Jakob Michelsen made his first season as manager.

Summary
In the off-season, on 18 November 2016, the board chose to sack manager Nanne Bergstrand, citing "a need to get a new voice and new energy into the club's sporting development". Later the same month, Jakob Michelsen was announced as the successor. He joined the club on a three-year deal from the Danish club SønderjyskE.

The team had a disappointing run in the 2016-17 Svenska Cupen, getting knocked out in the group stage following a 0–1 away loss against Östersunds FK in a deciding fixture.

Hammarby had a promising first half of the 2017 Allsvenskan season, claiming the 6th place in the table after 12 games. During the spring, Hammarby also won both fixtures against fierce rivals AIK (2–1) and Djurgården (3–1).

In May 2017, Hammarby hired Jesper Jansson as the new director of football, ahead of a hectic summer transfer window. Hammarby sold 9 players, most notably defender Joseph Aidoo that moved to Genk in a reported club record transfer. At the same time, Hammarby brought in 8 new signings. Among these were Mads Fenger, Jeppe Andersen, Muamer Tanković, Johan Wiland and Sander Svendsen.

In the second half of the campaign, Hammarby struggled to produce any sort of challenge in the league, and subsequently dropped of in the table. Both manager Jacob Michelsen and several of the new signings suffered criticism from both supporters and pundits as the club eventually finished 9th in Allsvenskan.

Players

Squad information

Transfers

In

Out

Player statistics

Appearances and goals

Disciplinary record

Club

Coaching staff

Other information

Pre-season and friendlies

Friendlies

Competitions

Overall

Allsvenskan

League table

Results summary

Results by round

Matches
Kickoff times are in (UTC+01) unless stated otherwise.

Svenska Cupen

2016–17
The tournament continued from the 2016 season.

Kickoff times are in UTC+1.

Group stage

2017–18
The tournament continues into the 2018 season.

Qualification stage

Footnotes

Hammarby Fotboll seasons
Hammarby Fotboll